The Goiânia Arena is an indoor sporting arena used mostly for volleyball that is located in Goiânia, Brazil.  The capacity of the arena is 15,000 spectators for concerts and 11,333 for sports. The arena hosts concerts and indoor sporting events, such as volleyball, basketball, and UFC.

History
Goiânia Arena opened in 2002. The arena hosted a number of senior Brazilian national basketball team games, during their drive to qualify for the 2019 FIBA World Cup.

References

External links

Arena information

Basketball venues in Brazil
Indoor arenas in Brazil
Sports venues in Goiás
Volleyball venues in Brazil